2020 Basketball Champions League Final was the concluding game of the 2019–20 Basketball Champions League season, the 4th season of FIBA's premier basketball league in Europe. The final and the Final Eight were played in the O.A.C.A. Olympic Indoor Hall in Athens.

San Pablo Burgos won its first Champions League title after defeating AEK.

Background

San Pablo Burgos
Five years before, in August 2015, the professional section of CB Miraflores had been established. In 2017, Burgos made its debut in the Liga ACB, the highest Spanish league. In the 2019–20 ACB season, which was played out earlier that year, Burgos reached the semi-finals of the playoffs.

AEK
For AEK, this was the second time it appeared in a final of the Basketball Champions League, having won the 2018 title. It was also the second time AEK hosted the Final Four/Eight tournament at the O.A.C.A. Olympic Indoor Hall.

Keith Langford, the team's leading scorer, was named Most Valuable Player of the competition. AEK also had Tyrese Rice, the MVP of the previous 2018–19 season, on its roster.

Venue
The O.A.C.A. Olympic Indoor Hall was the stage of the final tournament for the second time, having already hosted the 2018.

Road to the final

Game details
Giannis Antetokounmpo, the reigning NBA Most Valuable Player, was in attendance for the final.

References

Final
2020
CB Miraflores
AEK B.C.
2020s in Athens